De Hoop Dam is a dam on the Kamdeboo River, near Graaf-Reinet, Western Cape, South Africa. It was established in 1938 and its primary purpose is for irrigation.

See also
List of reservoirs and dams in South Africa
List of rivers of South Africa

References 

 List of South African Dams from the Department of Water Affairs and Forestry (South Africa)

Dams in South Africa
Dams completed in 1938